Gun for a Coward is a 1957 American CinemaScope Western film directed by Abner Biberman and starring Fred MacMurray, Jeffrey Hunter and Janice Rule. The film also stars Josephine Hutchinson as MacMurray's mother, despite being less than five years his senior.

Plot
Will Keough is a rancher with two younger brothers, who are called Bless and Hade. They live with their widowed mother, Hannah, whose husband was bitten by a rattlesnake when Bless was a young boy. Ever since that day, Hannah has been determined to shield Bless from the hard life of the West and turn him instead into a refined, gentler soul. In so doing, she sometimes embarrasses Bless in front of the ranch's other men.

Hannah wants to move to the big, sophisticated city of St. Louis and take her middle son with her. Bless refuses at the last minute, then feels guilty when the months go by and his unhappy mother becomes ill and passes away.

Will, meanwhile, builds the ranch into one of the territory's largest. His primary concerns are rustlers and neighbor Audrey, whom he loves and intends to marry, although he has been slow to commit. What he doesn't know is that Audrey has fallen in love with Bless.

Before and during a cattle drive to Abilene, more than once Bless is accused of being cowardly. He fails to adequately back up Hade in a bar fight. A fake rattlesnake is placed on Bless while asleep on the trail, terrifying him.

Bless then alienates Will by confessing that he and Audrey wish to marry. Rustlers stampede the cattle, and Hade is shot to death by a rustler.  Will blames Bless, and they fight to a draw after the funeral.  Will then allows Bless to lead the posse riding out to confront the rustlers, whereupon Will rides out of  town right after he tells Audrey that he approves of their future together.

Cast
 Fred MacMurray as Will Keough 
 Jeffrey Hunter as Bless Keough
 Janice Rule as Aud Niven
 Chill Wills as Loving 
 Dean Stockwell as Hade Keough 
 Josephine Hutchinson as Mrs. Keough
 Betty Lynn as Claire
 Iron Eyes Cody as Chief
 Robert Hoy as Danny
 Jane Howard as Marie
 Marjorie Stapp as Rose 
 John Larch as Stringer 
 Paul Birch as Andy Niven
 Bob Steele as Burkee
 Frances Morris as Mrs. Anderson

See also
 List of American films of 1957

References

External links
 
 
 

1957 films
1957 Western (genre) films
American Western (genre) films
Films with screenplays by Robert Wright Campbell
Universal Pictures films
1950s English-language films
1950s American films
CinemaScope films